Ricketson is the surname of the following people:
Damien Ricketson (born 1973), Australian composer
Doug Ricketson (1930–2019), Australian rugby league footballer
James Ricketson (born 1949), Australian filmmaker
Luke Ricketson (born 1973), Australian rugby league footballer
Staniforth Ricketson (1891–1967), Australian financier